Chenoa is the debut album from Spanish artist Chenoa, recorded in Miami, Madrid, London, Bratislava and Milan at the months of March and April 2002, after she left the Operación Triunfo academy as the fourth finalist.

The album contains many genres and touches of different music styles including pop, R&B, Latin, dance and fado in the Dulce Pontes' cover of "Cançao do Mar", titled in Spanish "Oye, Mar" ("Listen, Sea"). The album also contains two songs in English, "Love Story" and "Mystify".

Chenoa sold over 500,000 copies in Spain over 61 weeks in Top 100 chart, and she was nominated for the Spanish music industry awards Premios Amigo as best female new artist, and best female artist. Year 2002 finished with a Spanish tour that included more than 70 dates.

Track listing

 "Yo Te Daré" (Vanesa klein) - 3:06
 "Atrévete" (Mystify) (Chris Anderson, Debra Andrew) - 3:14
 "El Centro De Mi Amor" (William Luque) - 3:47
 "Oye, Mar" (Cançao do Mar) (Joaquim F. Brito, Ferrer Trindade) - 4:50
 "Love Story" (Par Astron, Bagge Anders, Reed Vertelney) - 3:54
 "Una Mujer" (I'm a Woman) (Aldo Nova, Reed Vertelney) - 3:53
 "Cuando Tu Vas" (Luque) - 3:18
 "Quiero Ser" (Luque, Kiko Velázquez) - 3:22
 "El Alma En Pie" (with David Bisbal) (José Abraham) - 4:08
 "El Tiempo Que Me Das" (Alicia Arguiñano, Maribí Etxaniz) - 3:53
 "Desnuda Frente A Tí" (You Bring out the Best in Me) (Aberg, Rein, Sela) - 3:45
 "Chenoa" (Laura Corradini, Sebastián Heredia) - 4:25
 "Chicas Solas" (Girls Night Out) (Mehyer, Olafsdottir) - 3:18
 "Mystify" (Anderson, Andrew) - 3:15

Personnel

Chris Anderson – Keyboards, Programming, Producer, Dirigida, Realization
Javier Anguera – Metales
Alicia Arguiñano – Coros
Antonio Baglio – Mastering
Bratislava Symphony Orchestra – Recording
Gregory Carrero – Guitar, Guitar (Steel)
Tico Darna – Producer
Mar DePablos – Producer, Dirigida, Vocal Coach, Realization
Luis Gómez Escolar – Adaptation
Maribí Etxaniz – Coros
Diego Galaz – Violin, String Score
Roger "George" González – Production Assistant
Carlos Guevara – Producer
Craig Hardy – Programming
David Hernando – Director
Paco Ibanez – Metales
Tiagi Lambert – Make-Up
Jose Lopez – Production Assistant
Gary Miller – Programming
Antonio Miró – Vestuario
Charlie Noguera – Technician
Maite Palencia – Producer
Ramón Pallarés – Metales
Archie Pena – Percussion, Bateria
José Puga – Graphic Design
Carlos Quintero – Arranger, Programming, Producer, Mixing, Dirigida, Vocal Coach, Realization, Recording
Brian Rawling – Keyboards, Programming, Producer, Mixing, Dirigida, Realization
Pedro Rodriguez – Mixing, Recording
Rubendarío – Photography
Christian Saint Val – Assistant Engineer
Adrian Schinoff – Arranger, Programming
Susana Ensin Tarriño – Producer
Walter Turbitt – Keyboards, Programming, Mixing
Kiko Velázquez – Arranger, Programming
Jong Uk Yoon – Assistant Engineer
Pilar Zamora – Adaptation

Chart performance

Singles

2002 albums
Chenoa albums
Albums produced by Brian Rawling